Harry Gruyaert (born 1941) is a photographer known for his images of India, Morocco and Egypt as well as of the west of Ireland and for his use of colour. He is a member of Magnum Photos. His work has been published in a number of books, been exhibited widely and won the Kodak Prize.

Life and work
Gruyaert was born in 1941 in Antwerp, Belgium. He studied at the School for Photo and Cinema in Brussels from 1959 to 1962. He began freelance work in Paris, while working as a director of photography for Flemish television.

In 1969 Gruyaert made his first trip to Morocco. The resulting work won him the Kodak Prize in 1976 and was published in the book Morocco in 1990. He travelled to India for the first time in 1976 and to Egypt in 1987.

In 1972 he photographed the Summer Olympic Games in Munich and the first Apollo flights as they were shown on a television set. This series, TV Shots, was first exhibited at the Delpire Gallery in 1974 and later elsewhere. It was published as a book in 2007.

Gruyaert joined Magnum Photos in 1982 and became a full member in 1986.

Innovation and reception
Gruyaert was experimenting with Kodachrome colour film for his documentary work in the late 1960s, contemporary with work by Ernst Haas, William Eggleston and Joel Meyerwitz touted by US commentators as 'The New Color', though after that of other Americans Saul Leiter, Gordon Parks and Vivian Maier in the 1950s. With Alex Webb, he was one of the first in the Magnum agency to shoot entirely in colour when he was invited to join in 1982.

Wilco Versteeg, in reviewing his work in 2018 writes that;

Publications

Publications by Gruyaert
Lumières Blanches. Paris: Centre national de la photographie, 1986. . Introduction by Alain Macaire and text by Richard Nonas, translated into English by Brice Matthieussent. Published on the occasion of the Gruyaert exhibition at the Palais de Tokyo, 24 April–9 June 1986.
Morocco
Morocco. Munich: Schirmer/Mosel, 1990. . With an interview by Brice Matthieussent.
Marruecos. Seville: Fundación de las Tres Culturas, 2009. . Text in English, French and Spanish, by Gerardo Ruiz-Rico Ruiz and Brice Mathieussent, translated by Francis Merino and Meriem Abdelaziz.
Maroc. Paris: Textuel, 2013. .
Made in Belgium. Paris: Nathan/Delpire, 2000. . Text by Hugo Claus, in Flemish and French.
Rivages
Paris: Textuel, 2003. . Preface by Charles-Arthur Boyer.
Paris: Textuel, 2008.
Harry Gruyaert. Photo Poche series. Arles, France: Actes Sud, 2006. .
TV Shots. Göttingen: Steidl, 2007. . With a text by Jean-Philippe Toussaint.
Harry Gruyaert: Edges. Amsterdam: Mets & Schilt, 2009. . Edited and with preface by Charles-Arthur Boyer.
Moscow 1989-2009. Paris: Be-Pôles, 2010. . Text in French and English.
Roots. Paris: Xavier Barral, 2012. .
Irish Summers. Gallery 51, 2020. . Work made in Ireland between 1983 and 1984.

Publications with others
Way to Gods: Magunamu Foto: Kumano kodō, Santiago e no michi, ed. Nagasaka Yoshimitsu. Tokyo: Kawade Kobō Shinsha, 1999. .  (Additional title on front cover: Ancient Kumano Roads and Roads to Santiago.) Contains photographs of Camino de Santiago by Gruyaert and Peter Marlow, and of Kumano kodō by Marlow, Elliott Erwitt and Chris Steele-Perkins.
Nord-pas-de-Calais Picardie. Paris: National Geographic, 2004. . Photographs by Gruyaert, French-language text by Marie Desplechin.
Tour Granite. Paris: Xavier Barral, 2009. . Photographs by Gruyaert and Jean Gaumy, text by Éric Reinhardt.

Exhibitions

Solo exhibitions
1974: TV Shots, Delpire Gallery, Paris.
2008: TV Shots, Phillips de Pury & Company, Cologne, Germany.
2008: TV Shots, installation, Paris Photo.
2012: Moscow 1989-2009. Moscow Biennale 2012, Le Manège, Moscow.
2012/2013: Roots, Le Botanique, Brussels.
2015: Harry Gruyaert, Magnum Photos, London, 15 September – 31 October 2015.
2018: Retrospectieve, Fotomuseum Antwerp, Antwerp, 9 March 2018 - 10 June 2018.

Exhibitions with others
1976: TV Shots: Photo Murals by Harry Gruyaert and Charles Goossens, International Center of Photography.
2012: Cartier-Bresson: A Question of Colour, Somerset House, London.

Award
1976: Winner, Kodak Prize.

Collections
Gruyaert's work is held in the following permanent collections:
MAST, Foto/Industria, Bologna, Italy.
Harry Ransom Center, University of Texas at Austin, TX.
Bibliothèque Nationale de France, Paris.
David Roberts collection, London.

References

External links
Gruyaert's portfolio at Magnum Photos

Photographers from Antwerp
Living people
1941 births
Magnum photographers
Photography in India
Photography in Egypt
Street photographers
Humanist photographers